Efulensia is a genus of flowering plants belonging to the family Passifloraceae.

Its native range is Western Tropical Africa to Western Uganda.

Species:

Efulensia clematoides 
Efulensia montana

References

Passifloraceae
Malpighiales genera